Sir James Halyburton or Haliburton of Pitcur was a Scottish landowner and politician.

Biography
He was the son of Sir George Halyburton of Pitcur and a great-nephew of James Halyburton, tutor of Pitcur. In 1586 his father granted the lands of Thorngreen to James and his future wife Margaret, daughter of James Scrimgeour of Dudhope. In 1617, as laird of Pitcur, he represented the barons of Forfarshire in the convention of Estates and the Parliament of Scotland.

His children included:

 James Haliburton of Pitcur, who married Maria, daughter of Robert Ker, 1st Earl of Roxburghe
 William Haliburton of Pitcur, who married Marjorie, daughter of David Carnegie, 1st Earl of Southesk
 George Haliburton of Keilour, who was the grandfather of Margaret Haliburton who married Sir George Mackenzie of Rosehaugh, and great-grandfather of James Halyburton who was commissioner for Forfarshire at the time of the Union
 Magdalen Haliburton, who married John Carnegie, 1st Earl of Northesk
 Margaret Haliburton, who married James Elphinstone, 1st Lord Coupar.
 Catherine Haliburton, who married John Bethune, 12th of Balfour, commissioner for Fife in 1644, 1646, and 1649.

References

Shire Commissioners to the Parliament of Scotland
Members of the Parliament of Scotland 1617
Members of the Convention of the Estates of Scotland 1617
Scottish knights
Year of birth missing
Year of death missing
Scottish landowners
James